Wyck Island is a small island lying close to the west side of Brooklyn Island in the east portion of Wilhelmina Bay, off the west coast of Graham Land. Discovered by the Belgian Antarctic Expedition, 1897–99, under Gerlache, and named on the recommendation of Dr. Frederick A. Cook, surgeon of the expedition in honor of R.A. Van Wyck, first mayor of Greater New York City.

See also 
 List of Antarctic and sub-Antarctic islands

Islands of Graham Land
Danco Coast